The Dorset Police and Crime Commissioner is the police and crime commissioner, an elected official tasked with setting out the way crime is tackled by Dorset Police in the English County of Dorset. The post was created in November 2012, following an election held on 15 November 2012, and replaced the Dorset Police Authority. The first incumbent is Independent Martyn Underhill, who retired in 2021. He was succeeded by David Sidwick.

List of Dorset Police and Crime Commissioners

See also
2012 England and Wales police and crime commissioner elections
2016 England and Wales police and crime commissioner elections
2021 England and Wales police and crime commissioner elections

References

Police and crime commissioners in England
Politics of Dorset